Geber is the Latinized form of the Arabic name Jabir. It may refer to:

Jabir ibn Hayyan (died c. 806–816), early Islamic alchemist and polymath
 Pseudo-Geber, name given to the anonymous authors of the 13th–14th century Latin alchemical writings attributed to Jabir ibn Hayyan
 Jabir ibn Aflah (1100–1150), Spanish-Arab astronomer and mathematician 
 Geber (crater), a crater on the Moon named after Jabir ibn Aflah
 Nick Geber, England-born, American sports radio and television personality

See also 
 
 Gever (disambiguation)
 Jaber (disambiguation)
 Ezion-Geber, a biblical seaport on the northern extremity of the Gulf of Aqaba